Dick Anderson (born June 15, 1952) is an American politician. He has served as a Republican member for the 6th district in the North Dakota House of Representatives  since 2011.

References

1952 births
Living people
People from Bottineau County, North Dakota
Farmers from North Dakota
Republican Party members of the North Dakota House of Representatives
21st-century American politicians